The A530 road is a road linking the A525 east of Whitchurch, Shropshire, England with the A559 east of Northwich, in Cheshire.  The road follows the route:

A525
Nantwich
Crewe
Middlewich
A559

The road is a non primary route, except between Middlewich and the A556, east-south-east of Northwich (Croxton Lane and King Street).

The road is also one of the most dangerous roads in England regarding crashes (especially at the junctions at Wistaston Green Road and Colley's Lane) in Alvaston, Nantwich.

References 

Roads in England
Roads in Cheshire
Transport in Shropshire